Steven Whitehall (born 8 December 1966) is an English retired footballer who played as a striker in the Football League with Rochdale, Mansfield Town and Oldham Athletic.

Post-playing career
Whitehall graduated from the University of Liverpool in 1999 with a degree in Biology and also from the University of Salford in 1999 with a degree in Physiotherapy.

He has had spells as physiotherapist at both Northwich Victoria and Southport, also becoming caretaker manager at the latter.

Personal life
His son Danny Whitehall is also a footballer.

References

Living people
1966 births
People from Bromborough
English footballers
Association football forwards
English Football League players
Southport F.C. players
Rochdale A.F.C. players
Mansfield Town F.C. players
Oldham Athletic A.F.C. players
Chester City F.C. players
Nuneaton Borough F.C. players
Marine F.C. players
English football managers
Southport F.C. managers
Alumni of the University of Salford
Association football physiotherapists